Christopher Michael Maloney is an English singer and musician from Liverpool, who was first seen as a contestant on The X Factor in 2012.

Career

2012–13: The X Factor
In 2012, Maloney auditioned in Liverpool for the ninth series of The X Factor. He struggled with nerves, but managed to overcome them and sing Bette Midler's "The Rose". Afterwards, he received a standing ovation from the audience and judges Louis Walsh, Gary Barlow, Tulisa Contostavlos and guest judge Geri Halliwell. Barlow asked him "How the hell have you kept that voice hidden until now?", and Maloney admitted that he had previously filled out the application form for the show, but tore it up every year due to his nerves and other people telling him he was not good enough. All four judges gave him a "Yes" and he advanced to boot camp. He made it to the judges' houses stage alongside Nicola Marie, Melanie Masson, Carolynne Poole, Brad Shackleton and Kye Sones. Maloney failed to make it into Barlow's final three as Masson, Poole and Sones were selected ahead of him, but was later thrown a lifeline when it was revealed that all four judges could choose a wildcard, and the wildcard with the most public votes would become the thirteenth finalist. On the night of the first live show, Maloney was announced as the wildcard winner, beating Times Red, Amy Mottram and Adam Burridge to win the final spot in the live shows.

Maloney took on the role of The X Factor novelty act for the ninth series. Despite being dubbed a "cabaret" and "cruise ship" singer by Walsh, Maloney advanced on the public vote nine times, receiving the most votes from weeks 1–7 before finishing in third place after being eliminated from the first of the live final shows.
During January & February 2013, Maloney appeared on the Live X Factor tour across the UK.

2013–present: Post X Factor

In April 2013, in an interview with the Liverpool Echo, Maloney confirmed that he had signed a contract with independent record label Tristar Records. On 27 October 2013, he released his debut single "My Heart Belongs to You".

Christopher opened his first performing arts school in Liverpool on 9 June 2014. Maloney established the academy to nurture the talent of the younger generation in Merseyside.
Of his venture, he said: "I want to give something back to the community. I'm trying to make the performing arts accessible to the children."
At the academy, the youngsters have the opportunity to train under Maloney's direction, as well as a team of top quality coaches.

In 2016, Maloney opened his second academy in Wirral, which moved to Prenton Park in 2018.

Maloney entered the Celebrity Big Brother house in January 2016. On 26 January 2016, Maloney was the fifth person to be evicted after receiving the fewest votes. He had spent 22 days in the house.

In November 2018, Maloney's debut autobiography, titled Wildcard, was released.

Filmography

Television

Live Tours

References

1977 births
English pop singers
English gay musicians
British LGBT singers
Living people
Musicians from Liverpool
The X Factor (British TV series) contestants
21st-century English singers
20th-century English LGBT people
21st-century LGBT people